St. Alban's Church, or variants thereof, may refer to:

Australia
 Cathedral Church of St Alban the Martyr in Griffith, New South Wales
St Alban's, Five Dock in Sydney, New South Wales

Canada
St. Alban's Cathedral (Kenora), Ontario 
 St. Alban's Anglican Church (Ottawa)
 St. Alban's Anglican Church (Richmond, BC)
 Cathedral of St. Alban the Martyr, Toronto, Ontario

Denmark
 St. Alban's Church, the Anglican church in Copenhagen
 St. Alban's Church, the Roman Catholic parish church of Odense

England
St Alban's Church, Acton Green, London
 St Alban the Martyr, Birmingham
 St Alban's Church, Blackburn, Lancashire
 St Alban's Church, Bournemouth, Dorset
 St Alban's Church, Broadheath, Altrincham, Greater Manchester
St Alban's, Cheam, London
 St Alban's Church, Forest Town, Nottinghamshire
St Alban's Church, Frant, East Sussex
St Alban's Church, Ilford, London
Garrison Church of St Alban the Martyr, Larkhill, Wiltshire
 London (central)
 St Alban, Wood Street
 St Alban's Church, Holborn
 St Alban's Church, Macclesfield, Cheshire
St Alban's Catholic Church, North Finchley, London
 St Albans Cathedral, St Albans, Hertfordshire
 St Alban's Church, Sneinton, Nottingham
 St Alban's Church, Southampton
 St Alban's Church, Tattenhall, Cheshire
 St Alban's Church, Teddington, London Borough of Richmond upon Thames
 St Alban's Church, Wallasey, Merseyside
 St Alban's Church, Warrington, Cheshire
St Albans, West Leigh, parish church in the diocese of Portsmouth
 Ss Alban and Stephen Church, St Albans

Japan
 St. Alban's by St. Andrew's, Tokyo

New Zealand
 St Alban's Church, Pauatahanui, Wellington

United States 
St. Albans Church, Brandywine Hundred, in New Castle County, Delaware
 St. Alban's Episcopal Church (disambiguation)

Wales 
St Alban's Church, Llanelli